Hibbertia glomerata is a species of flowering plant in the family Dilleniaceae and is endemic to the south-west of Western Australia. It is a much-branched shrub with mostly oblong or egg-shaped to elliptic leaves and yellow flowers borne on the ends of short side shoots, with nine to twelve stamens, sometimes in groups of three, arranged around the three carpels.

Description
There are ten to twelve stamens, either free from each other or in groups of three, arranged around the three glabrous carpels, each carpel containing one ovule.

Taxonomy
Hibbertia glomerata was first formally described in 1863 by George Bentham in Flora Australiensis from specimens collected by James Drummond from the Swan River Colony. The specific epithet (glomerata) means"collected into heads", referring to the flowers.

In 2002, Judy Wheeler described four subspecies and the names are accepted by the Australian Plant Census:
 Hibbertia glomerata subsp. wandoo J.R.Wheeler has ten to twelve stamens mostly free from each other, all leaves are narrow egg-shaped with the narrower end towards the base, the outer sepals shorter than the inner sepals, and mostly flowers from August to October.

Distribution and habitat
This hibbertia grows occurs in the Jarrah Forest and Swan Coastal Plain biogeographic regions of south-western Western Australia. Subspecies darlingensis is found in forest and woodland, sometimes on roadside reserves, on the Darling Scarp, mainly near Perth. Subspecies ginginensis occurs in woodland and forest mainly on roadsides near Gingin. The autonym glomerata is found in a variety of habitats in the south-west of Western Australia and subsp. wandoo is restricted to an area near Beverley where it grows in wandoo woodland.

Conservation status
Hibbertia glomerata is classified as "not threatened" by the Government of Western Australia Department of Parks and Wildlife, but subsp. ginginensis is classified as "Priority Two" meaning that it is poorly known and from only one or a few locations and subsp. wandoo as "Priority Three" meaning that it is poorly known and known from only a few locations but is not under imminent threat.

See also
List of Hibbertia species

References

glomerata
Flora of Western Australia
Plants described in 1863
Taxa named by George Bentham